Crum Hill, located in northwest Massachusetts, United States, in the towns of Monroe and Florida, is the highest point in Franklin County. The mountain, part of the Hoosac Range (a west facing escarpment rising from the Hoosic River Valley directly east of North Adams, Massachusetts), is crossed by a trail system maintained by a local snowmobile club, the Florida Mountaineers. They maintain a trail map on their website.

Although Crum Hill is the highest geologic point of the Berkshires, Mount Greylock, part of the Taconic Mountains and unrelated to the Berkshires geology, is often misattributed with the high point.

The summit of Crum Hill is located in the town of Monroe, Franklin County; the west side of the mountain is located in the town of Florida, part of Berkshire County. The north and east sides of Crum Hill drain into Dunbar Brook, thence into the Deerfield River, the Connecticut River, and Long Island Sound; the west side drains into the Cold River, thence into the Deerfield River; and the south side drains into the Deerfield River via several small brooks.

The summit is also the site of the Hoosac Wind Power Project.

References

Geology of Massachusetts
Mountains of Franklin County, Massachusetts
Mountains of Berkshire County, Massachusetts
Mountains of Massachusetts